Defending champion Robert Lindley Murray defeated Bill Tilden in the final, 6–3, 6–1, 7–5 to win the men's singles tennis title at the 1918 U.S. National Championships.

The event was held at the West Side Tennis Club in Forest Hills, Queens, from August 26 through September 3, 1918.

Final eight

References

Men's singles
1918